Can Tho International Airport , formerly Trà Nóc Airport is an airport located in Can Tho in Mekong Delta region of Vietnam.

It aimed to be able to process up to 5 million passengers a year. It will serve air travel in the region, boost Mekong Delta's economy, improving defence, security and international integration.

History 
Trà Nóc Airport was originally constructed during the Vietnam War in 1965 by United States Air Force (USAF) civil engineering units as a military airfield, which became Binh Thuy Air Base.  It was used by the USAF as well as being the Headquarters of the Republic of Vietnam Air Force (VNAF) 4th Air Division until 1975.

On 19 April 1969 the VAL-4 Light Attack Squadron began combat operations, flying air support for the Mobile Riverine Force in the Mekong Delta of South Vietnam. The missions included normal patrol, overhead air cover, scramble alert and gunfire/artillery spotting. On 31 March 1972 the squadron conducted its last combat mission prior to its disestablishment on 10 April 1972.

After 1975, the facility was initially unused, then later operated as a small regional airport for Can Tho. It was expanded and upgraded to international status, with completion due in 2008.

Upgrading of Trà Nóc airport

The expansion work of Trà Nóc airport started on 4 January 2006. The project will be implemented in two phases, covering an area of 85.04 ha. 
Phase 1: due to be completed in 2008, work including: improvement of the paved runway (2,400 m x 45 m), apron (27,491 m2), cost estimate: 370 billion VND ($23 million). Upon completion, this airport will be capable to handle medium range aircraft such as the Airbus A320, A321, and the Boeing 767.
Phase 2: construction of a new terminal (19,000 m2), cargo terminal and other facilities. Cost estimate: 400–500 billion VND ($25 to 31 million). The capacity of this terminal is 2 million passengers per year.

Current status
The airport is operating at loss, serving only 20% of its designed capacity.

In 2017 the 917th Mixed Air Transport Regiment (a.k.a. Đồng Tháp Squadron) of 370th Air Force Division in the Vietnam People's Air Force was moved to Cần Thơ from Tan Son Nhut Air Base.

Airlines and Destinations

See also 

 List of airports in Vietnam

References

External links

Can Tho International Airport - Official Website
Can Tho Airport - Vietnam Online

Airports in Vietnam
Buildings and structures in Cần Thơ